Jonava City Eldership is a Lithuanian eldership, located in a central part of Jonava District Municipality.

Geography
 Rivers: Neris, Taurosta, Lankis, Varnaka

Demography

References

Elderships in Jonava District Municipality